This list is of the Places of Scenic Beauty of Japan located within the Prefecture of Chiba.

National Places of Scenic Beauty
As of 1 December 2020, four Places have been designated at a national level.

Prefectural Places of Scenic Beauty
As of 1 May 2020 three Places have been designated at a prefectural level.

Municipal Places of Scenic Beauty
As of 1 May 2020, eight Places have been designated at a municipal level.

Registered Places of Scenic Beauty
As of 1 December 2020, three Monuments have been registered (as opposed to designated) as Places of Scenic Beauty at a national level.

See also
 Cultural Properties of Japan
 List of parks and gardens of Chiba Prefecture
 List of Historic Sites of Japan (Chiba)

References

External links
  Cultural Properties in Chiba Prefecture

Tourist attractions in Chiba Prefecture
Places of Scenic Beauty